Jeff Bleckner (born August 12, 1943) is an American theatre and television director.

Biography
Born in Brooklyn, New York, Bleckner made his directorial debut off-Broadway with The Unseen Hand/Forensic and the Navigators, an evening of one-act plays by Sam Shepard, in 1970. He also directed three off-Broadway productions of works by David Rabe: the first two plays in his Vietnam War trilogy, The Basic Training of Pavlo Hummel and Sticks and Bones (both of which transferred to Broadway), and The Orphan. Additional Broadway credits include Paul Zindel's The Secret Affairs of Mildred Wild and Herb Gardner's The Goodbye People.

Bleckner's television directing credits include Welcome Back, Kotter, Bret Maverick, The Stockard Channing Show, Knots Landing, Dynasty, Trapper John, M.D., Lou Grant, Remington Steele, Hill Street Blues, Commander in Chief, Medium, Hawthorne Blackout Effect, NTSB The crash of flight 323 and Boston Legal, in addition to numerous television movies. His most recent project is the pilot for Conspiracy, a potential series for the 2007-08 season, starring Lisa Sheridan as a Washington, D.C. attorney attempting to undercover the secrets of a pharmaceutical company she successfully defended.

Awards and nominations
Awards
1971 Drama Desk Award Most Promising Director (The Basic Training of Pavlo Hummel)
1972 Drama Desk Award for Outstanding Director (Sticks and Bones)
1982 Emmy Award for Outstanding Directing in a Drama Series (Hill Street Blues)
1984 Emmy Award for Outstanding Directing in a Limited Series or a Special (Concealed Enemies)
1984 Directors Guild of America Award for Outstanding Directorial Achievement in a Dramatic Series (Hill Street Blues)
2001 Directors Guild of America Award for Outstanding Directorial Achievement in Movies for Television (The Beach Boys: An American Family)

Nominations
1972 Tony Award for Best Direction of a Play (Sticks and Bones)
1982 Emmy Award for Outstanding Directing in a Drama Series (Hill Street Blues)
1985 Emmy Award for Outstanding Directing in a Limited Series or a Special (Do You Remember Love)
1986 Directors Guild of America Award for Outstanding Directorial Achievement in Dramatic Specials (Do You Remember Love)
1995 Emmy Award for Outstanding Individual Achievement in Directing for a Miniseries or a Special (Serving in Silence: The Margarethe Cammermeyer Story)
2000 Emmy Award for Outstanding Miniseries (The Beach Boys: An American Family)
2001 Directors Guild of America Award for Outstanding Directorial Achievement in Movies for Television (The Beach Boys: An American Family)
2004 Directors Guild of America Award for Outstanding Directorial Achievement in Movies for Television (The Music Man)
2012 Directors Guild of America Award for Outstanding Directorial Achievement in Movies for Television/Mini-Series Beyond the Blackboard (2011)

External links

Jeff Bleckner at the Internet off-Broadway Database

1943 births
American theatre directors
American television directors
Primetime Emmy Award winners
Drama Desk Award winners
Directors Guild of America Award winners
People from Brooklyn
Living people
Film directors from New York City